The River City Relay was a play in a National Football League (NFL) game involving the New Orleans Saints and Jacksonville Jaguars that took place on December 21, 2003, at Alltel Stadium, now known as TIAA Bank Field, in Jacksonville, Florida. With the Jaguars leading 20–13, the Saints used three laterals to score a touchdown as time expired in regulation. However, New Orleans kicker John Carney missed the ensuing extra point that would have sent the game into overtime, and instead gave Jacksonville the 20–19 victory.

Background
The Saints, at 7–7 entering the game, were attempting to reach the playoffs for the first time since 2000. However, they needed to win both of their final two games to have a chance at qualifying for the postseason. The Jaguars had already been eliminated from postseason contention. While the Saints led early on in the game 3–0 after a John Carney field goal, the scoring had been mostly dominated by the Jaguars. With just seven seconds left at the end of regulation, the Jaguars had built a 20–13 lead on the Saints.

The play

The Saints were on their own 25-yard line looking at second down and 10. Quarterback Aaron Brooks passed the ball to the right side of the field to receiver Donté Stallworth, who caught the pass at midfield. Stallworth then bounced off a tackle attempt by Jaguars cornerback Fernando Bryant and turned inside and broke two more tackles. The clock had already reached zero, and Stallworth pitched the ball to the 34-yard line to Michael Lewis, who ran the ball to the 25-yard line of Jacksonville. He then turned and pitched the ball to Deuce McAllister, who ran to the Jaguars' 20-yard line. McAllister then pitched the ball to the right side of the field to Jerome Pathon, who caught the ball at the 24-yard line of Jacksonville. Brooks, who had hustled all the way downfield, then laid a block on the last Jaguars defender and Pathon dove into the end zone.

There was a lengthy delay while the officials determined that all of the ball transfers (after the pass to Stallworth) were indeed legal laterals. All the Saints needed was a John Carney extra point to send the game into overtime. Saints coach Jim Haslett decided not to attempt a two-point conversion to win the game immediately.

Aftermath
Carney lined up to kick the extra point, hit a dead push, and the kick sailed wide right. The famous reaction of Saints play-by-play radio announcer Jim Henderson was a horrified scream: "NOOOO!!! He missed the extra point wide right! Oh my God, how could he do that?" With no time remaining on the clock, the game was over, giving the Jaguars an improbable 20–19 victory. Sports writer Jon Bois calculated the chances of a successful lateral play followed by a missed extra point, based on statistics from the year 2000 onward, to be 1.2% for the lateral play, and the missed extra point to be 1%. When combined it comes to a statistical probability of 0.012% with the next season to include such an event to be in the year 3500.

Earlier in the season, Coach Haslett had stated to the media that he trusted Carney so much, that he'd even stake his life on him. When reminded later that day of those same comments, Haslett stated, "Then I'd probably be dead right now. He's one of the great all-time kickers. I never would have guessed this would happen."

With the loss, the Saints fell to 7–8 on the season and were eliminated from contention for the 2003 NFL playoffs. However, even if the Saints had won in overtime, they would have been eliminated from the playoffs, as the Dallas Cowboys won their tenth game of the season that day (9 was the highest possible number of wins the Saints could have had if they won) and the Seahawks eventually won their tenth game to gain a wild card. The Saints would, however, finish their season on a high note the next week with a 13–7 home victory over the playoff-bound Dallas Cowboys. For the Jaguars, the victory would lift them to a 5–10 record. They would go on to lose the next week, 21–14, to the Atlanta Falcons.

The River City Relay later went on to win the 2004 Best Play ESPY Award. It was the last multi-lateral touchdown in an NFL game until the Miracle in Miami in 2018, which saw Miami win the game 34-33, with no extra point attempt required.

Officials 
Referee: Gerald Austin (#34)
Umpire: Roy Ellison (#81)
Head Linesman: John Schleyer (#21)
Line Judge: Carl Johnson (#101)
Field Judge: Scott Edwards (#3)
Side Judge: Rick Patterson (#15)
Back Judge: Jim Howey (#37)

See also
The Play, a similar last-second play in a 1982 college football game
2007 Trinity vs. Millsaps football game, a 2007 NCAA Division III game that featured a similar, but even longer, game-ending play
Wide Right (Buffalo Bills)
Miracle in Miami
Lunatic Lateral

References

External links
River City Relay on YouTube
ESPN recap

Jacksonville Jaguars
New Orleans Saints
2003 National Football League season
National Football League games
American football incidents
2003 in sports in Florida
21st century in Jacksonville, Florida
December 2003 sports events in the United States